Methiodal is a pharmaceutical drug that was used as an iodinated contrast medium for X-ray imaging. Its uses included myelography (imaging of the spinal cord); for this use, cases of adhesive arachnoiditis have been reported, similar to those seen under the contrast medium iofendylate.

It is not known to be marketed anywhere in the world in 2021.

References 

Radiocontrast agents
Organoiodides
Sulfonates